is a seinen manga by Go Nagai. It's a Japanese historical fiction manga. The protagonist name, Sharaku, is a reference to Toshusai Sharaku, a famous Japanese woodblock printer. The existing tankōbon doesn't include the 34 pages special Naniwa - Kanjo no "Koi" (「浪速」艦上の“恋”), published in Weekly Morning #2·3 (2002).

Plot
The protagonist is a female reporter who witnesses the changes between the end of the Edo period and the beginning of the Meiji period.

External links
Sharaku at the World of Go Nagai webpage
Sharaku at D/visual

2001 manga
Go Nagai
Historical anime and manga
Seinen manga